Stephen A Simpole (born 1955) is a retired lightweight rower who competed for Great Britain.

Rowing career
Simpole was part of the lightweight eight that secured a bronze medal at the 1975 World Rowing Championships. He won a gold medal at the 1977 World Rowing Championships in Amsterdam with the lightweight men's eight. The following year he was part of the lightweight eight that successfully defended their title and won the gold medal at the 1978 FISA Lightweight Championships in Copenhagen.

References

Living people
1955 births
British male rowers
World Rowing Championships medalists for Great Britain